Edith Beebe Carhart (April 14, 1879 - April 1, 1964) was the City Librarian in Bellingham, Washington, and compiled the "History of Bellingham".

Early life
Edith Beebe Carhart was born on April 14, 1879, in Terre Haute, Indiana, the daughter of Dr. Joseph Carhart (1849-1926) and Ida Beebe Clark (1852-1914).

She graduated from North Dakota State Teachers College and received private training in library work.

Career
Edith Beebe Carhart was the principal of grade schools in Alaska, Oregon and Washington. 

She was the Librarian and Manager of the Boarding Department of the State Teacher's College at Mayville, North Dakota for 5 years and city librarian in Bellingham for more than 16 years. 

Later in life she entered the real estate and insurance business.

She compiled a History of Bellingham (1926). She wrote The Angora Wool Rabbit: A Manual for the Beginner (Miller & Sutherlen printing Company, 1930).

Personal life
Edith Beebe Carhart moved to Washington in 1916 and lived at 2727 Eldridge, Bellingham, Washington.

She died at the age of 84 on April 1, 1964, in Bellingham, Washington. She was buried in Bayview Cemetery, Bellingham.

References

1879 births
American librarians
American women librarians
1964 deaths
People from Terre Haute, Indiana